Yana Orjo (possibly from in the Quechua spelling Yana Urqu; yana black, urqu mountain, "black mountain") is a mountain in the Andes of Peru which reaches a height of approximately . It is located in the Huancavelica Region, Churcampa Province, on the border of the districts of Chinchihuasi and Cosme.

References

Mountains of Peru
Mountains of Huancavelica Region